Wuli may refer to:

 Wuli District, a district in the Upper River Division of the Gambia

China 
 Wuli railway station, station on the Qinghai–Tibet Railway
Towns
 Wuli, Lingshan County (武利镇), Guangxi
Written as "五里镇":
 Wuli, Guigang, in Gangnan District, Guigang, Guangxi
 Wuli, Xinyang, in Pingqiao District, Xinyang, Henan
 Wuli, Tongcheng County, in Tongcheng County, Hubei
 Wuli, Huai'an, in Huaiyin District, Huai'an, Jiangsu
 Wuli, Ankang, in Hanbin District, Ankang, Shaanxi
 Wuli, Yijun County, in Yijun County, Shaanxi
Community
 Wuli, Wulipu, Shayang, Jingmen, Hubei

Science
Wuli (journal), a journal of physics published by the Chinese Physical Society